Mark Taylor (born 24 September 1960) is a retired British international swimmer. He competed in three events at the 1980 Summer Olympics. He won the 1981 British Championship in 200 metres freestyle.

References

External links
 

1960 births
Living people
British male swimmers
Olympic swimmers of Great Britain
Swimmers at the 1980 Summer Olympics
Place of birth missing (living people)
British male freestyle swimmers
20th-century British people